Schillerplatz may refer to:

 Schillerplatz (Stuttgart)
 Schillerplatz (Mainz)
 Schillerplatz (Dresden)
 Schillerplatz (Vienna)